Eric John "Rick" Bennett (born July 24, 1967) is an American former ice hockey left winger and head coach of the Savannah Ghost Pirates. He is the former head coach of the Union Dutchmen ice hockey team of Union College, where he coached from 2011 until 2022.

Playing career
Bennett was a four-year letterwinner (1986–90) and co-captain at Providence, where he was recognized as a Hobey Baker finalist (1990) and two-time winner of the Lou Lamoriello Trophy as team MVP.  He was named an All-American during the 1988-89 season and earned All-Hockey East Second Team honors in 1990. A left-winger, Bennett finished with 134 points (50 goals, 84 assists) in 128 career games. Bennett skated on the famed B-B-G line, along with center Mike Boback and right wing Robbie Gaudreau.  Rick, who graduated with a B.A. in general studies, was inducted into the Providence College Athletic Hall of Fame in 2012.

Bennett was a third-round draft pick (54th overall) of the Minnesota North Stars in the 1986 NHL Entry Draft.  His draft rights were later traded to the New York Rangers.  Bennett appeared in 15 games with the Rangers over three seasons (1989–90, 1990–91, 1991–92).  Bennett's 10-year professional career also included stints with the Binghamton Rangers (AHL), Springfield Indians (AHL), Hershey Bears (AHL), Springfield Falcons (AHL), Albany River Rats (AHL), Cincinnati Cyclones (IHL), Jacksonville Lizard Kings (ECHL) and Pee Dee Pride (ECHL).  Bennett served as a player assistant coach for the Jacksonville Lizard Kings and Pee Dee Pride.

Coaching career

Bennett served as head coach at Union College from 2011 to 2022, leading the Dutchmen to three ECAC Hockey regular season titles (2011–12, 2014-14 & 2016-17), three ECAC Hockey tournament titles (2012, 2013 & 2014), four NCAA Tournament appearances (2012, 2013, 2014 & 2017), two Frozen Fours (2012 & 2014) and one NCAA championship title (2014) by defeating Minnesota.  Bennett won ECAC Hockey's Tim Taylor Award for conference coach of the year twice (2012 & 2017), and won the American Hockey Coaches Association's Spencer Penrose Award for NCAA Division I coach of the year in 2014.  Bennett resigned in 2022 following an allegation about his coaching style and practices that was substantiated through an investigation by Union College.

On May 19, 2022, Bennett was announced to be the first head coach of the ECHL expansion team Savannah Ghost Pirates.

Personal life
Bennett and his wife, Karyn have five children together; their son Blake plays hockey for American International College in Springfield.  The family resides in Clifton Park, New York.

Career statistics

Regular season and playoffs

Head coaching record

† Bennet resigned mid-season.

Awards and honors

References

External links

Coach Bio from Union College

1967 births
American men's ice hockey left wingers
Ice hockey players from Massachusetts
Living people
Minnesota North Stars draft picks
New York Rangers players
Providence Friars men's ice hockey players
Sportspeople from Springfield, Massachusetts
Union Dutchmen ice hockey coaches
New Jersey Rockin' Rollers players
Orlando Jackals players
AHCA Division I men's ice hockey All-Americans
Ice hockey coaches from Massachusetts